Bow often refers to:

 Bow and arrow, a weapon
 Bowing, bending the upper body as a social gesture
 An ornamental knot made of ribbon

Bow may also refer to:

 Bow (watercraft), the foremost part of a ship or boat
 Bow (position), the rower seated in the bow of a racing shell

Knots
 Bow knot, a shoelace knot or a rosette
 Bow tie, a type of necktie
 Pussy bow, a style of neckwear

Music
 Bow (music), used to play a stringed instrument
 Musical bow, a musical instrument resembling an archer's bow
 EBow, electronic device for playing the electric guitar
 Bows (band), a band from the UK

Porcelain
 Bow porcelain factory

Places

England
 Bow, Devon, a village in mid Devon
 Bow, a hamlet in the parish of Ashprington in South Devon
 Bow, London, a district
 Bow, Oxfordshire, a hamlet

United States
 Bow, Kentucky
 Bow, New Hampshire
 Bow, Washington

Canada
 The Bow (skyscraper), Calgary, Alberta
 Bow River, Alberta

Other
 Bow (name), including a list of people with the surname or given name
 Bow and warp of semiconductor wafers and substrates
 Rema language (ISO-639: bow), Papuan language spoken in New Guinea

See also
 BOW (disambiguation)
 Beau (disambiguation)
 Bo (disambiguation)
 Bow Creek (disambiguation)
 Bowman (disambiguation)
 Earwire